Theodore Sunday Wrobeh (born 21 October 1981) is a Liberian football player who last played for Mohammedan S.C. (Kolkata) in the I-League.

References

External links

1981 births
Living people
I-League players
Liberian footballers
Association football forwards